Aggeliki Iliadi (born 16 September 1977) is a Greek folk singer.

Personal life
Born in Athens, Attica, she began dating entrepreneur Babis Lazaridis in 2004, while he was still married. On June 3, 2005, she gave birth to their son, Babis Jr. They were together until his death, in December 2008. From 2013 to 2018, Iliadi was in a relationship with the football player Savvas Gentsoglou and on July 8, 2014, their son Vasilis was born. Iliadi is the granddaughter of Kaiti Grey, one of the most popular singers of Greece in the 1950s and 60s.

Discography

Studio albums and EPs

Duets

Collection Hits

Cover Editions

Singles & EPs

References

External links 
 
 Profile at the Greek edition of People 

1977 births
Greek folk singers
Living people
Singers from Athens